is one of the 16 wards of the city of Nagoya in Aichi Prefecture, Japan. As of 1 October 2019, the ward had an estimated population of 66,318 and a population density of 8,088 persons per km². The total area was 8.20 km².

Geography
Atsuta Ward is located near the geographic center of Nagoya city.

Surrounding municipalities
Showa Ward
Naka Ward
Nakagawa Ward
Mizuho Ward
Minato Ward
Minami Ward

History
The area of present-day Atsuta Ward was known since ancient times for its association with Atsuta Shrine. Atsuta Town in Aichi District was incorporated with the establishment of the municipality system in the early Meiji period. It was annexed to the city of Nagoya, initially as part of Minami Ward, and became Atsuta Ward in 1937.

Economy
Atsuta Ward is a major commercial center due to its proximity to the center of Nagoya metropolis. The rolling stock manufacturer Nippon Sharyo has its headquarters in the ward.

Education

Nagoya Gakuin University

Transportation

Railroads
Central Japan Railway Company - Tōkaidō Main Line
 
Meitetsu - Nagoya Main Line - Tokoname Line
  -
Nagoya Municipal Subway – Meijō Line
  - -
Nagoya Municipal Subway – Meikō Line
  -

Highways
Japan National Route 1
Japan National Route 19
Japan National Route 22
Japan National Route 154
Japan National Route 19
Japan National Route 247

Local attractions
Atsuta Shrine – well known Shinto shrine

Noted people 
Minamoto no Yoritomo – first shōgun of the Kamakura period, born at Seigan-ji
Noriyuki Haga –motorcycle racer
Yukiko Okada – Idol Singer
Tamaasuka Daisuke – Sumo wrestler

References

 
Wards of Nagoya